Camouflage is a 1977 Polish drama film directed by Krzysztof Zanussi. The film was selected as the Polish entry for the Best Foreign Language Film at the 50th Academy Awards, but was not accepted for nomination.

Plot
Students are staying at a summer linguistics study camp. One of the directors, Jaroslaw, is young and prefers a direct, informal approach. He is opposed by the manipulative Jakub. For example, Jaroslaw allows a dissident student to participate. While the jury prize is given to a poor paper, the unconventional school of thought still receives a recommendation. When the deputy rector arrives for the closing ceremonies, and since he rejects the unofficial view, tensions rise. They climax when the student bites the rector's ear. The police are called in.

Cast

 Piotr Garlicki as Jarosław Kruszyński
 Zbigniew Zapasiewicz as Jakub Szelestowski
 Christine Paul-Podlasky as Nelly Livington-Pawluk
 Mariusz Dmochowski as Vice Dean
 Wojciech Alaborski as Kiszewski
 Mieczysław Banasik as Józef
 Krystyna Bigelmajer as Zofia
 Jadwiga Colonna-Walewska as Deanery Manager
 Alfred Freudenheim as Official
 Marian Glinka as Resort Manager
 Hanna Grzeszczak as Girl in Kitchen
 Iwona Słoczyńska as Ania
 Riccardo Salvino as Italian

See also
 List of submissions to the 50th Academy Awards for Best Foreign Language Film
 List of Polish submissions for the Academy Award for Best Foreign Language Film

References

External links
 

1977 films
1970s Polish-language films
1977 drama films
Films directed by Krzysztof Zanussi
Films scored by Wojciech Kilar
Polish drama films